José Margues (born 19 September 1946) is a Portuguese rower. He competed in the men's single sculls event at the 1972 Summer Olympics.

References

1946 births
Living people
Portuguese male rowers
Olympic rowers of Portugal
Rowers at the 1972 Summer Olympics
Place of birth missing (living people)